Elsinore or Helsingør is a Danish city.

Elsinore may also refer to:

Businesses and organizations
 Elsinore (company), a company that began as a subsidiary of Hyatt Hotels Corporation
 Elsinore Technologies Inc., a software company, maker of Visual Intercept
 Elsinore Multimedia, a software and video game developer in Hollywood, Florida, U.S.

Edifices and features
 Elsinore Castle or Kronborg, a castle in Helsingør
 Elsinore Arch, a stone arch in Cincinnati, Ohio, U.S.
 Elsinore Theatre, a historic movie theatre in Salem, Oregon, U.S.

Places

Canada
 Elsinore, Edmonton, a neighbourhood in Edmonton, Alberta
 Elsinore, Ontario, a community in Ontario

United States
 Lake Elsinore, California, a city
 Lake Elsinore
 Elsinore Valley
 Elsinore Trough
 Elsinore Fault Zone
 Elsinore, Utah, a town

Transportation

Aircraft
 Elsonore, an Armstrong Whitworth Ensign aircraft

Motorcycles
 Honda MR50 Elsinore (1974–1975), an off-road mini cycle
 Honda CR250M Elsinore (1973–1976), a two-stroke motorcycle
 Honda CR125M Elsinore, a smaller version of the CR250M

Ships
 SS Elsinore, a 1913 steam tanker for the Union Oil Company
 Elsinore (steamboat), a steam launch used in the state of Washington, U.S.

Other uses
 Elsinore (comics), an American comic book limited series
 Elsinore (video game), a time loop adventure game following the events of Hamlet
 Elsinore, Pomona and Los Angeles Railway, part of the Southern California Railway
 Elsinore Sewing Club, a Danish organization that transported Jews to safety during World War II

See also 
 Hamlet at Elsinore, a 1964 television production
 Helsingor (disambiguation)
 The Mutiny of the Elsinore (novel), a novel by Jack London